Vigipirate is France's national security alert system. Created in 1978 through interministerial sessions and falling within the responsibilities of the prime minister, it has since been updated three times: in 1995 (following a terror bombing campaign), 2000 and 2004.

Details
Until 2014 the system defined four levels of threats represented by five colors: white, yellow, orange, red, scarlet.  The levels called for specific security measures, including increased police or police/military mixed patrols in subways, train stations and other vulnerable locations.

In February 2014 the levels were simplified to 'vigilance' (or surveillance) and 'attack alert'. In December 2016, they were reorganized in three levels: 'vigilance', 'heightened security/risk of attack' and 'attack emergency'.

Levels of alert (to 2014)

Levels of alert (2014-2016)

Levels of alert (from 2016)

History of alert levels

See also

 States of emergency in France
 Opération Sentinelle
 UK Threat Levels, used in the United Kingdom from 2006
 BIKINI state, previously used in the United Kingdom
 Homeland Security Advisory System (United States)

References

Law enforcement in France
Alert measurement systems
Emergency management in France
1978 introductions
Valéry Giscard d'Estaing